The Thomastown Province was an electorate of the Victorian Legislative Council (Australia), centred on Thomastown, Victoria. It was abolished in 1988.

Members for Thomastown

Election results

See also
 Parliaments of the Australian states and territories
 List of members of the Victorian Legislative Council

References

Former electoral provinces of Victoria (Australia)
1976 establishments in Australia
1988 disestablishments in Australia